The ZF Mgcawu District Municipality (known before 1 July 2013 as Siyanda)  is one of the 5 districts of the Northern Cape province of South Africa. The seat of ZF Mgcawu is Upington. The majority (76%) of its 236,783  people speak Afrikaans (2011 Census). The district code is DC8.

ZF Mgcawu District Municipality is named after Upington's first post-1994 democratically elected mayor, Zwelentlanga Fatman Mgcawu. In a previous renaming, from Gordonia, the name Siyanda, meaning "we are growing", was used.

Geography

Neighbours
ZF Mgcawu is surrounded by:
 the Republic of Botswana in the north
 John Taolo Gaetsewe (DC45), formerly Kgalagadi, in the north-east
 Frances Baard (DC9) in the east
 Pixley ka Seme (DC7) in the south-east
 Namakwa (DC6) in the south-west
 the Republic of Namibia in the west

Local municipalities
The district contains the following local municipalities:

Demographics
The following statistics are from the 2001 census.

Gender

Ethnic group

Age

Politics

Election results
Election results for Siyanda in the South African general election, 2004. 
 Population 18 and over: 131 760 [62.78% of total population]
 Total votes: 75 264 [35.86% of total population]
 Voting % estimate: 57.12% votes as a % of population 18 and over

References

External links
 Official website

District municipalities of the Northern Cape
ZF Mgcawu District Municipality